Ádám Hanga (born 12 April 1989) is a Hungarian professional basketball player for Real Madrid of the Spanish Liga ACB and the EuroLeague. He was drafted 59th overall by the San Antonio Spurs in the 2011 NBA draft. Hanga won the EuroLeague Best Defender award in 2017.

Early life
Hanga was born to a Hungarian mother and a Zanzibari Tanzanian father, who studied in Hungary that time. His father left the family when Ádám was 3 years old and he was brought up by his mother and maternal grandparents.

He is the nephew of African-Russian journalist and television personality Yelena Khanga.

Professional career
Hanga began his career with the Hungarian club, Albacomp, in 2006, at the age of 17, and stayed with the Székesfehérvár-based club until 2011. In June 2009, he was invited to the Adidas Eurocamp, an event that is held annually in Treviso, for top-flight players, aged between 18 and 21. After three days of training and scrimmages, he was ranked the sixth best non-U.S. player in his age group. The 2010–11 season turned out to be his breakout year, as he dominated the Hungarian League.

In May 2011, he moved to the Spanish League, signing with Bàsquet Manresa.  The San Antonio Spurs selected Hanga with the 59th pick in the 2011 NBA draft.

In July 2013, Hanga signed a four-year deal with the Spanish club Baskonia. In August 2014, he was loaned to the Italian League team Sidigas Avellino, for the 2014–15 season. Hanga came back to Baskonia Vitoria-Gasteiz on May 11, 2015, for the final games of the 2014–15 ACB season, after finishing the Lega Basket season with Avellino. On June 28, 2017, Hanga was registered by Baskonia for the right of first refusal. On July 9, 2017, Hanga signed an offer sheet with FC Barcelona Lassa. On July 12, 2017, Baskonia matched the offer sheet to Hanga, keeping Hanga in their roster. On July 23, 2017, Hanga re-signed with Baskonia, through the 2019–20 season. On August 22, 2017, Baskonia and FC Barcelona Lassa reached an agreement for the transfer of Hanga to the Catalan club. On July 9, 2019, Barcelona Bàsquet announced Hanga had extended his contract with the club until 2022, with an option to continue until 2023. On July 16, 2021, Hanga officially parted ways with the Spanish club after four seasons.

On July 23, 2021, he signed a two-year deal with Liga ACB archrivals Real Madrid.

Career statistics

EuroLeague

|-
| style="text-align:left;"| 2013–14
| style="text-align:left;" rowspan=3| Baskonia
| 15 || 0 || 17.0 || .449 || .286 || .560 || 2.1 || 1.1 || .7 || .5 || 5.6 || 5.3
|-
| style="text-align:left;"| 2015–16
| 27 || 27 || 29.0 || .452 || .279 || .707 || 5.1 || 1.7 || 1.4 || 1.2 || 8.2 || 13.1
|-
| style="text-align:left;"| 2016–17
| 33 || 30 || 28.0 || .448 || .336 || .667 || 4.4 || 2.4 || 1.3 || 0.7 || 10.5 || 13.0
|-
| style="text-align:left;" | 2017–18
| style="text-align:left;" rowspan=2| Barcelona 
| 26 || 25 || 24.4 || .452 || .347 || .679 || 3.7 || 2.0 || 0.7 || 0.7 || 8.7 || 9.1
|-
| style="text-align:left;"| 2018–19
| 27 || 13 || 20.5 || .463 || .282 || .745 || 4.0 || 1.9 || 1.1 || 0.3 || 8.8 || 10.6
|- class="sortbottom"
| style="text-align:left;"| Career
| style="text-align:left;"|
| 128 || 95 || 24.7 || .453 || .313 || .684 || 4.1 || 1.9 || 1.1 || .7 || 8.7 || 10.8

National competition

Regular season

Playoffs

References

External links
Ádám Hanga at acb.com 
Ádám Hanga at eurobasket.com
Ádám Hanga at euroleague.net
Ádám Hanga at draftexpress.com
Ádám Hanga at legabasket.it 
Ádám Hanga at kosarsport.hu 

1989 births
Living people
Alba Fehérvár players
Basketball players from Budapest
Bàsquet Manresa players
FC Barcelona Bàsquet players
Hungarian expatriate basketball people in Italy
Hungarian expatriate basketball people in Spain
Hungarian men's basketball players
Lega Basket Serie A players
Liga ACB players
San Antonio Spurs draft picks
Saski Baskonia players
Small forwards
S.S. Felice Scandone players